Utah State Route 163 may refer to:

 Utah State Route 163, the state highway designation (legislative overlay) for U.S. Route 163 (US-163) within San Juan County, Utah, United States, that runs through the picturesque Monument Valley and connects U.S. Route 191 in Bluff with Arizona at Oljato-Monument Valley
 By Utah State law, US-163 within the state has been defined as "State Route 163" since 1977
 From 1986 to 2004 state law defined State Route 163 as also including a  section of highway beyond the eastern terminus of US-163, east to Utah State Route 262 in Montezuma Creek. (This section is now the western end of Utah State Route 162).
 Utah State Route 163 (1968-1977), a former state highway in southeastern Juab County, Utah, United States, that ran along the former routing of U.S. Route 91 and connected Interstate 15 at Mills Junction, with Utah State Route 28 in Levan (the route was renumbered as Utah State Route 78 in 1977) 
 Utah State Route 163 (1933-1966), a former state highway in southern Cache County, Utah, United States, that connected Avon with Utah State Route 101 in Hyrum (the route was renumbered as Utah State Route 126 in 1966)

See also

 List of state highways in Utah
 List of U.S. Highways in Utah
 List of named highway junctions in Utah
 List of highways numbered 163

External links

 Utah Department of Transportation Highway Resolutions: Route 163 (PDF)